The 2013 Qatar motorcycle Grand Prix was the first round of the 2013 MotoGP season. It was held at the Losail International Circuit near Doha in Qatar on 7 April 2013.

Classification

MotoGP

Moto2

Moto3

Championship standings after the race (MotoGP)
Below are the standings for the top five riders and constructors after round one has concluded.

Riders' Championship standings

Constructors' Championship standings

 Note: Only the top five positions are included for both sets of standings.

References

Qatar motorcycle Grand Prix
Qatar
Motorcycle Grand Prix
Qatar motorcycle Grand Prix